Knave of Hearts may refer to:
The Jack of Hearts in a deck of playing cards
The Knave of Hearts, a recurring character in the American television show Once Upon a Time in Wonderland
Knave of Hearts (Alice's Adventures in Wonderland), a character in Lewis Carroll's Alice's Adventures in Wonderland
The Knave of Hearts (1925 book), a 1925 illustrated children's book by Louise Saunders with pictures by Maxfield Parrish
The Knave of Hearts (1950 novel), a 1950 novel by Barbara Cartland, see Barbara Cartland bibliography
The Knave of Hearts (1962 novel), a 1962 novel by Elizabeth Linington
"Knave of Hearts" (novello), a music composition by Arthur Somervell
The Knave of Hearts (1919 film), a 1919 British silent romance film 
Knave of Hearts (film), a 1954 film directed by René Clément
Knave of Hearts (Martian area), an informal name for the area of Mars being explored by the spacecraft Phoenix

See also 

Jack of Hearts (disambiguation)
Queen of Hearts (disambiguation)
King of Hearts (disambiguation)

Hearts (disambiguation)
Knave (disambiguation)